The 2020 United States Olympic Team Trials for wrestling were held at the Dickies Arena of Fort Worth, Texas, on April 2–3, 2021. This event determined the representative of the United States of America for the 2020 Summer Olympics at each Olympic weight class. Originally scheduled to take place at the Bryce Jordan Center in University Park, Pennsylvania and on April 4–5, 2020, this event was postponed by the United States Olympic & Paralympic Committee and USA Wrestling on March 13, 2020, along with the 2020 Summer Olympics due to the COVID-19 pandemic.

Medal summary

Men's freestyle

Women's freestyle

Men's Greco–Roman

Qualification procedures

Direct qualification 
To qualify for the 2020 U.S. Olympic Team Trials directly, a wrestler must have achieved a certain result at at least one of the determined qualifying tournaments (set by USA Wrestling). The procedures were the following:

Men's freestyle

Women's freestyle

Greco-Roman

Indirect qualification 
To qualify for the 2020 U.S. Olympic Team Trials indirectly, a wrestler was required to have certain past accolades that could back up their spot. The required accomplishments were the following:

Men's freestyle

Women's freestyle

Greco–Roman

Collegiate qualification 
These athletes have qualified for the 2020 U.S. Olympic Team Trials through collegiate wrestling. 

Men's Freestyle – Greco–Roman - 2021 NCAA Division I Championships
125 lb Spencer Lee
133 lb Roman Bravo-Young
141 lb Nick Lee
149 lb Austin O'Connor
157 lb David Carr
165 lb Shane Griffith
174 lb Carter Starocci
184 lb Aaron Brooks
197 lb A.J. Ferrari
285 lb Gable Steveson
Women's Freestyle - 2021 NCWWC Championships

 101 lb Angelina Gomez
 109 lb Emily Shilson
 116 lb Felicity Taylor
 123 lb Cheyenne Sisenstein
 130 lb Cameron Guerin
 136 lb Brenda Reyna
 143 lb Emma Bruntil
 155 lb Alara Boyd
 170 lb Yelena Makoyed
 191 lb Sydnee Kimber
Women's Freestyle - 2021 NAIA Women's Wrestling National Invitational Championships

 101 lb Nina Pham
 109 lb Mckayla Campbell
 116 lb Peyton Prussin
 123 lb Jasmine Hernandez
 130 lb Bridgette Duty
 136 lb Desiree Zavala
 143 lb Waipuilani Estrella-Beauchamp
 155 lb Sienna Ramirez
 170 lb Jordan Nelson
 191 lb Nkechinyere Nwankwo

Qualified Non-Competitors 
These qualified athletes have chosen or were unable to compete in the 2020 U.S. Olympic Team Trials.

Men's Freestyle

 57 kg Spencer Lee (injury)
57 kg Nick Suriano (COVID-19 positive test)
57 kg Roman Bravo-Young (decision)
65 kg Tyler Graff
65 kg Logan Stieber (decision)
65 kg Austin O'Connor
74 kg Isaiah Martinez (injury)
74 kg Mekhi Lewis (injury)
74 kg Alex Dieringer (injury)
86 kg Zahid Valencia (injury)
97 kg J'den Cox (missed weight)
Jacob Kasper
Nick Nevills
Shane Griffith

Tournament format 

 Challenge Tournament–(single elimination)- The first part of the trials determined who advanced over to the best–of–three finale and it took place in the first day of competition.
 Championship Series–(best‐of‐3 match final wrestle‐off)- In the second part of the trials, the finals which determined the ultimate winner took place, in the second day of competition.

Brackets

Men's freestyle 

Note
At 74 and 97 kg, Jordan Burroughs and Kyle Snyder had an automatic berth to the best–of–three as returning World Championship medalists, therefore the finalists of the challenge tournament competed for advancement to the finals, unlike the other weight classes where both competitors advance. Also at 74 kg, Kyle Dake earned an automatic bid to the semifinals as the returning World Champion at 79 kg. At 97 kg, J'den Cox had also earned an automatic bid to the semifinals as the returning World Champion at 92 kg, however, he was pulled out of the bracket on the day of the event by USA Wrestling for making weight minutes after the closure of the weight-ins.

57 kg 

Best‐2-out-of‐3 Match (Wrestle‐Off)

Winner – Thomas Gilman

65 kg 

Best‐2-out-of‐3 Match (Wrestle‐Off)

Winner – Jordan Oliver

74 kg 

Challenge

Best‐2-out-of‐3 Match (Wrestle‐Off)

Winner – Kyle Dake

86 kg 

Best‐2-out-of‐3 Match (Wrestle‐Off)

Winner – David Taylor

97 kg 

Challenge

Best‐2-out-of‐3 Match (Wrestle‐Off)

Winner – Kyle Snyder

125 kg 

Best‐2-out-of‐3 Match (Wrestle‐Off)

Winner – Gable Steveson

Consolation brackets

Men's freestyle

57 kg

65 kg

74 kg

86 kg

97 kg

125 kg

See also 

 United States at the 2020 Summer Olympics

 Wrestling at the 2020 Summer Olympics

 Wrestling at the 2020 Summer Olympics – Qualification

References 

Wrestling qualification for the 2020 Summer Olympics